Parcel das Paredes is a large submerged bank in Brazil with an area of about 200 km2. It is a coralline structure located in the Atlantic Ocean off the shore near Caravelas, Bahia State.

Geography
The Parcel das Paredes lies about 30km east of the continental shore. Although the reef is submerged, parts of it lie above water
at low tide. It is a dangerous area for navigation, but an excellent fishing and scuba-diving ground.r Sailing Directions 2004 East Coast of South America,  p. 63</ref> The Abrolhos Archipelago lies 35 km further to the east and this Parcel is part of the same structure. The maximum tide amplitude in the reef area is approximately 1.7 m.Edward J. Petuch, Biogeography and Biodiversity of Western Atlantic s, p. 157

Together with the Timbebas Reef located about 40 km to the north of the Parcel das Paredes'', as well as the Sebastiao Gomes Reef, Coroa Vermelha Reef and the Viçosa Reef to the southwest, all these reefs are part of the National Marine Park of Abrolhos (NMPA).

See also
Placer (geography)

References

External links
Abrolhos National Marine Park – Part 2
Abrolhos - The South Atlantic Largest Coral Reef Complex

Reefs of Brazil
Undersea banks of the Atlantic Ocean
Geography of Bahia